The Bombardier ALP-46 is an electric locomotive built in Germany by Bombardier between 2001 and 2002 for use in the United States. It is derived from the German Class 101. New Jersey Transit (NJT) is the only railroad to operate this locomotive model, which is used across the electrified NJT system, specifically on the Northeast Corridor, North Jersey Coast, Morris & Essex, and Montclair-Boonton lines. These locomotives replaced the ALP-44 locomotives, which were all retired by 2012.

Orders and delivery
NJT ordered 29 locomotives: the first 24 ALP-46 locomotives in December 1999 and an additional five locomotives in September 2001.

They were built by Bombardier (formerly ADtranz) at their Kassel, Germany plant. The first two locomotives were built as preseries locomotives for testing—4600 was tested on the TTCI test plant in Pueblo, Colorado, 4601 was sent to Kearny for testing on the NJT network. All locomotives were transported via road to the port of Bremen and shipped on Roro-ships of Wallenius Wilhelmsen Logistics to Port Newark-Elizabeth Marine Terminal, New Jersey.

In February 2008, NJT ordered twenty-seven  top speed ALP-46A locomotives from Bombardier, which were to haul Bombardier MultiLevel Coaches. The estimated value of the order was €155 million (approximately $230 million). In June 2009, NJT took up an option for a further nine locomotives, and spare parts, at a cost of $72 million.

On November 12, 2009, Bombardier ceremonially handed over the first two completed ALP-46As to New Jersey Transit over at their Kassel plant in Germany.

They arrived on NJT property on December 13. Locomotive 4629 was shipped by rail to a testing facility in Pueblo, Colorado, while 4630 was placed on the rails at the Meadows Maintenance Complex in Kearny for testing on property and maintenance training.

As of April 5, 2011, all locomotives have been delivered. As of May 7, 2011, all locomotives have entered regular revenue service.

In October 2019, as part of New Jersey Transit's 40th Anniversary, locomotive No. 4636 was wrapped into a Pennsylvania Railroad scheme.

Potential North American clients
Commuter rail operator GO Transit is considering the use of the ALP-46 for some or all of the operator's current lines. GO Transit has performed a study on electrification of their current diesel operations. However they have shown interest in other locomotives after further consideration.

Variants and operations
Both the ALP-46 and ALP-46A have been used to haul NJ Transit's Comet IIM, IV, V, and Multilevel fleet. The ALP-46 was also used to pull Amfleet consists on Amtrak's Clocker service in its final days of operation.

ALP-46
The ALP-46 locomotives produce  and are powered by overhead catenary.

The locomotives use Bombardier's MITRAC 3000 electric propulsion system. The system consists of a polyol-ester cooled transformer to reduce the catenary voltage which feeds two polyol-ester cooled GTO based traction converters (Bombardier MITRAC TC 3100 AC series). Each traction converter feeds the motors (Bombardier MITRAC DR 3700F series) of one truck.

ALP-46A
The ALP-46A locomotives use Bombardier's MITRAC 3000 electric propulsion system. The traction converters (Bombardier MITRAC TC 3360 AC series) are from a newer generation based on IGBT technology. The converters are water cooled and have individual inverters for each traction motor (Bombardier MITRAC DR 3700F series).

Images

See also 
 ALP-45DP

References

Literature

External links

 Bombardier ALP-46(A)
 New Jersey Transit
 Bombardier ALP-46 Electric Locomotive - USA

Bombardier Transportation locomotives
NJ Transit Rail Operations
11 kV AC locomotives
25 kV AC locomotives
Bo′Bo′ locomotives
Passenger locomotives
Electric locomotives of the United States
Railway locomotives introduced in 2000
Standard gauge locomotives of the United States